The Wedding Director is a 2006 Italian drama film directed by Marco Bellocchio. It was screened in the Un Certain Regard section at the 2006 Cannes Film Festival.

Cast
 Sergio Castellitto - Franco Elica
 Donatella Finocchiaro - Bona di Gravina
 Sami Frey - Principe di Gravina
 Gianni Cavina - Smamma
 Maurizio Donadoni - Micetti
 Bruno Cariello - Enzo Baiocco
 Simona Nobili - Maddalena Baiocco
 Claudia Zanella - Chiara Elica
 Corinne Castelli - Fara Domani / Lucia Mondella
 Silvia Ajelli - Gioia Rottofreno / Monaca di Monza
 Aurora Peres - Sposa
 Giacomo Guernieri - Sposo
 Carmelo Galati - Luigi

References

External links

2006 films
2000s Italian-language films
Films set in Sicily
2006 drama films
Films directed by Marco Bellocchio
Italian drama films
2000s Italian films